Statistics of Latvian Higher League in the 1952 season.

Overview
It was contested by 11 teams, and AVN won the championship.

League standings

References
RSSSF

Latvian SSR Higher League
Football 
Latvia